Saint Lucia  competed in the 2010 Commonwealth Games held in Delhi, India, from 3 to 14 October 2010.

Medals

Medalist

See also
 2010 Commonwealth Games

References

External links
 Times of India

Nations at the 2010 Commonwealth Games
2010 in Saint Lucian sport
Saint Lucia at the Commonwealth Games